Oser is a Hebrew given name and surname, which may refer to:

People
Bernard L. Oser (1899–1995), American scientist
Charles Oser (1902–1994), Swiss politician 
Lee Oser (born 1958), American writer
Michael Oser Rabin (born 1931), Israeli computer scientist

Other uses
Bernard L. Oser Award
Office of Special Education and Rehabilitative Services (OSERS), U.S. Dept of Education
Tu aurais dû me dire (Oser parler d'amour), French song
Wisconsin Office of State Employment Relations (OSER)

See also
Oeser
Öser (surname) 
Özer

Hebrew-language names
Surnames